John Joseph Montefusco Jr. (born May 25, 1950), nicknamed "The Count," is an American former professional baseball player and coach. He played as a right-handed pitcher in Major League Baseball from 1974 to 1986, most notably as a member of the San Francisco Giants with whom he won the National League Rookie of the Year Award and pitched a no-hitter. He also played for the Atlanta Braves, San Diego Padres, and the New York Yankees.

Baseball career 

Born in Long Branch, New Jersey and raised in Keansburg, Montefusco attended Middletown High School (since renamed as Middletown High School North). Named the National League Rookie of the Year in 1975, Montefusco's nickname was "The Count", a pun on his last name which sounds like Monte Cristo. In his 13-year career, his record was 90-83, with 1,081 strikeouts, and a 3.54 ERA. He was a National League All-Star in 1976, winning a career high 16 games that year.

On September 3, 1974, Montefusco entered his first major league game as a relief pitcher. Not only was he the winning pitcher that day, he also hit a home run in his first major-league at-bat. He is one of only a handful of pitchers to do so, and is one of two players to both hit a home run in his first at bat and win the Rookie of the Year Award. The other is Wally Moon.

Before a game against the Los Angeles Dodgers on July 4, 1975, Montefusco guaranteed he would win the game. He proceeded to throw a shutout as the Giants defeated the Dodgers 1–0.

On September 29, 1976, Montefusco threw a no-hitter for the Giants in a 9-0 victory versus the Atlanta Braves. It was the last no-hitter to be thrown by a Giant until Jonathan Sánchez threw one on July 10, 2009.

In June 1980, Montefusco got into a fight with Giants manager Dave Bristol after defeating the rival Los Angeles Dodgers. Montefusco was angry at Bristol for removing him from the game too early. 

After the 1983 season, Montefusco signed a three-year, $2.3 million contract to remain with the Yankees. He started the 1986 season in the team's bullpen but pitched in only four games before hip pain became too severe to pitch through. On September 28, he retired.

Legal issues 
Montefusco and his wife had been residents of Colts Neck Township, New Jersey. In October 1997, Montefusco was arrested and charged with beating his former wife of 23 years Doris, whom he had recently divorced, in her Colts Neck Township home.  He was held on $60,000 bail and was charged with aggravated sexual assault, making terroristic threats, assault, burglary and criminal mischief. Montefusco was indicted in December 1997 and was held on $1 million in bail.

Montefusco was released on bail in November 1999 after serving more than two years behind bars, and in February 2000, he was acquitted of the most serious charges and found guilty of criminal trespass and simple assault and sentenced to three years of probation.

In 2001, a U.S. district judge in Trenton, New Jersey dismissed a lawsuit filed by Montefusco against ESPN. Judge Anne Elise Thompson ruled that being compared to O. J. Simpson is not defamation. During a March 19, 2000 broadcast on ESPN's SportsCenter 2000, Doris Montefusco had likened her ex-husband to Simpson, who was acquitted in 1995 of the murder of Nicole Brown Simpson. An ESPN announcer during the broadcast had paraphrased Montefusco's ex-wife as saying "the only difference between this and the O.J. Simpson case is that she's alive to talk about it. Nicole Simpson is not."

Coaching career 

At the time of his October 1997 arrest, Montefusco had been a pitching instructor for the Tampa Yankees, a minor league team.  He later spent several years as the pitching coach for the Somerset Patriots in the independent Atlantic League of Professional Baseball until resigning in September 2005.

See also
 List of Major League Baseball no-hitters

References

External links

1950 births
Living people
Middletown High School North alumni
San Francisco Giants players
Atlanta Braves players
San Diego Padres players
New York Yankees players
Major League Baseball pitchers
Baseball players from New Jersey
Brookdale Jersey Blues baseball players
Major League Baseball Rookie of the Year Award winners
National League All-Stars
People from Colts Neck Township, New Jersey
People from Keansburg, New Jersey
Sportspeople from Long Branch, New Jersey
Sportspeople from Monmouth County, New Jersey
Amarillo Giants players
Columbus Clippers players
Decatur Commodores players
Phoenix Giants players
American people convicted of assault
American sportspeople convicted of crimes